List of vessels built at Crichton-Vulcan and Wärtsilä Turku shipyards covers all projects built during 1924–1989 (1990, 1991) at Crichton-Vulcan (from 1965 Wärtsilä Turku Shipyard) and Wärtsilä Perno shipyard.

 Yard number is a project-specific running number. Unrealised projects: 802–807, 868–869, 1015, 1029–1030, 1032, 1174, 1253 and 1299–1300.
 Name is the original name of the vessel.
 Type, type of the vessel.
 Shipowner shows the assigner and the country (flag).
 Keel lay or order date is the date when the keel is laid on the dock, or the order has been signed off. Since project number 1083 the date means the order date; that is marked in Italic.
 Handover is the date when the vessel has been handed over to the customer. A vessel handed over by the estate following the bankruptcy of Wärtsilä Marine is marked with *. The ships finished by the follower Masa-Yards are marked with MY.

Sources

References